Yeom Dong-jin (korean:염동진, hanja廉東振, February 14, 1909 – June 25, 1950), also known as Yeom Eung-Taik (korean:염응택, hanja廉應澤), was a Korean politician, and independent artist. He was a leader of Baekuisa (hangul:백의사), a Korean terrorist group.

See also 
 Kim Gu
 Kim Won-bong

References

1909 births
1950 deaths
Korean politicians
Korean independence activists
Assassinated Korean politicians
Korean revolutionaries
South Korean anti-communists
People imprisoned on charges of terrorism
Paju Yeom clan